Elmira Moldasheva is a ski-orienteering competitor from Kazakhstan. She competed at the 2009 World Ski Orienteering Championships in Rusutsu, where she placed 30th in the sprint, 32nd in the middle distance, 30th in the long distance, and 7th in the relay with the Kazakhstani team. She won a gold medal in the relay at the 2011 Asian Winter Games.

References

Year of birth missing (living people)
Living people
Kazakhstani orienteers
Female orienteers
Ski-orienteers
Asian Games medalists in ski orienteering
Ski-orienteers at the 2011 Asian Winter Games
Asian Games gold medalists for Kazakhstan

Medalists at the 2011 Asian Winter Games
Competitors at the 2017 World Games